Established in 1972, Rowan Williams Davies & Irwin Inc. (RWDI) is a specialty consulting engineering firm. The RWDI group of companies has offices in Canada, USA, United Kingdom, India, China, Singapore, Hong Kong, Malaysia and Australia. The company's headquarters is based in Guelph, Ontario, Canada.

RWDI is a wind engineering and environmental engineering consulting firm and has featured on numerous television documentaries involving wind engineering and related services for the world's tallest skyscrapers and landmark structures. The firm's facilities include five boundary layer wind tunnels, an open channel water flume, MM5 computer models for simulating atmospheric weather conditions and advanced computer modelling capabilities including computational fluid dynamics (CFD). The company recently created a software-as-a-service, web-based platform called Orbital Stack which allows designers and engineers to rapidly iterate on their designs while seeing the microclimate impact on a 3D viewer, with the option of additional expert consulting.

RWDI also has in-house model shops at each of its wind tunnel facilities that use stereolithography technology, integrated data acquisition, storage and processing systems, computer-aided drafting, and a broad base of specialized instrumentation. The firm has conducted wind engineering on projects including the London Millennium Bridge, International Commerce Centre in Hong Kong,  Petronas Towers in Malaysia, Freedom Tower on the WTC Site, the second span of the Tacoma Narrows Bridge, Taipei 101 Tower, and the mega-skyscraper Burj Khalifa, currently the world's tallest building. The company also does noise and air quality modelling, monitoring and permitting.

References

External links
RWDI's official website
RWDI new wind tunnel test facility in Florida, USA
 Discovery Channel Documentary
ASCE Paper about RWDI and Motioneering's role in the design of Taipei 101 and other projects
Engineering Taipei 101
Giant Damper Doubles as Building’s Interior Adornment
The Burj Dubai Tower - Wind Engineering
Canadian wind engineering specialists contribute to winning design for new Singapore casino
Wind Engineering for Milwaukee Art Museum
USAToday Article "All the comforts of home — or not"
Reference to RWDI's contribution to the design of the Reliant Stadium
Reference to RWDI's contribution to the design of the Citizens Bank Park Stadium, home of the Philadelphia Phillies
NIST Investigation of the World Trade Center Disaster - RWDI's contribution
RWDI tests Tacoma Narrows Bridge models in NRC wind tunnel
RWDI open's its Asia Pacific research and development centre
Chicago's Windiest Corner
CBS TV News interview with RWDI's Florida facility
World's Largest TLCD in Philadelphia

Engineering companies of Canada
Companies based in Guelph
Consulting firms established in 1972
1972 establishments in Ontario